1199 aluminium alloy is an aluminium-based alloy in the "commercially pure" wrought family (1000 or 1xxx series). With a minimum of 99.99% aluminium, it is the purest and least alloyed of the commercial aluminium alloys. It is soft and unsuitable for machining. At the same time, it possesses excellent corrosion resistance, electrical conductivity, and thermal conductivity. Commercially pure aluminium alloys are used in applications such as conductors, capacitors, heat exchangers, packaging foil and chemical equipment.

Chemical composition

The alloy composition of 1199 aluminium is:

 Aluminium: 99.99% min
 Copper: 0.0060% max
 Gallium: 0.0050% max
 Iron: 0.0060% max
 Magnesium: 0.0060% max
 Manganese: 0.0020% max
 Other, each: 0.0020% max
 Silicon: 0.0060% max
 Titanium: 0.0020% max
 Vanadium: 0.0050% max
 Zinc: 0.0060% max

References

Aluminum alloy table 

 Aluminium alloys